Afghan Turkestan, also known as Southern Turkestan, is a region in northern Afghanistan, on the border with the former Soviet republics of Turkmenistan, Uzbekistan and Tajikistan. In the 19th century, there was a province in Afghanistan named Turkestan with Mazari Sharif as provincial capital. The province incorporated the territories of the present-day provinces of Balkh, Kunduz, Jowzjan, Sar-e Pol, and Faryab. In 1890, Qataghan-Badakhshan Province was separated from Turkestan Province. It was later abolished by Emir Abdur Rahman.

Geography 

The area is agriculturally poor except in the river valleys, being rough and mountainous towards the south, but subsiding into undulating wastes and pasture-lands towards the Karakum Desert.

The province included the khanates of Kunduz, Tashkurgan, Balkh, and Akcha in the east and the four khanates or Chahar Vilayet ("four domains") of Saripul, Shibarghan, Andkhoy (city), and Maymana in the west.

Demographics 

The bulk of the people are Uzbek and Turkmen with large concentrations of Hazara, Tajik and Pashtun.

History 
Ancient Balkh or Bactria was an integral part of Bactria–Margiana Archaeological Complex, and was occupied by Indo-Iranians. In the 5th century BCE, it became a province of the Achaemenian Empire and later became part of the Seleucid Empire. About 250 BC Diodotus (Theodotus), governor of Bactria under the Seleucidae, declared his independence, and commenced the history of the Greco-Bactrian dynasties, which succumbed to Parthian and nomadic movements about 126 BC. After this came a Buddhist era which has left its traces in the gigantic sculptures at Bamian and the rock-cut topes of Haibak. The district was devastated by Genghis Khan, and has never since fully recovered its prosperity. For about a century it belonged to the Delhi empire, and then fell into Uzbek hands. In the 18th century it formed part of the dominion of Ahmad Shah Durrani, and so remained under his son Timur. But under the fratricidal wars of Timur's sons the separate khanates fell back under the independent rule of various Uzbek chiefs. At the beginning of the 19th century they belonged to Bukhara; but under the emir Dost Mahommed the Afghans recovered Balkh and Tashkurgan in 1850, Akcha and the four western khanates in 1855, and Kunduz in 1859. The sovereignty over Andkhoy, Shibarghan, Saripul, and Maymana was in dispute between Bukhara and Kabul until settled by the Anglo-Russian agreement of 1873 in favour of the Afghan claim. Under the strong rule of Abdur Rahman these outlying territories were closely welded to Kabul; but after the accession of Habibullah the bonds once more relaxed. In the late 19th and 20th centuries, many ethnic Pashtuns either voluntarily or involuntarily settled in Afghan Turkestan.

In 1890, the district of Qataghan and Badakhshan was divided from Afghan Turkestan and made into the Qataghan-Badakhshan Province. Administration of the province was assigned to the Northern Bureau in Kabul.

Notes

References

Further reading

Former provinces of Afghanistan
Turkestan
Regions of Afghanistan
Turkic toponyms